16 Biggest Hits is a 2006 Clint Black compilation album. It is part of a series of similar 16 Biggest Hits albums released by Legacy Recordings.

Track listing

Chart performance
16 Biggest Hits peaked at #72 on the U.S. Billboard Top Country Albums chart the week of February 24, 2007.

References

2006 greatest hits albums
Clint Black compilation albums
Black, Clint